The 1998 Friendship Tournament was the 4th edition of the Friendship Tournament, and was held from 17 to 21 October 1998 in Abu Dhabi, United Arab Emirates. Four teams participated: the United Arab Emirates, Sudan, Lebanon, and Syria. The United Arab Emirates won the tournament.

Participants 
  (hosts)

Standings

Matches

Winner

Statistics

Goalscorers

See also 
1997 Pan Arab Games

References 

Friendship Tournament